Barry Hennessy (born 14 October 1989) is an Irish hurler who plays as a goalkeeper for club side Kilmallock and at senior level for the Limerick county team.

Playing career

College
Hennessy first came to prominence as a hurler with Ardscoil Rís in Limerick. Having played in every grade, he was in goal on the college's senior team that reached the semi-finals of the Harty Cup for the first time.

Club
Hennessy joined the Kilmallock club at a young age and played in all grades at juvenile and underage levels, enjoying championship success in the minor and under-21 grades.

On 3 October 2010, Hennessy lined out in his first Limerick Senior Championship final. A 1-16 to 1-12 defeat of divisional side Emmets gave him his first championship medal.

After surrendering their championship crown in 2011, Kilmallock reached the championship decider again on 7 October 2012. Jake Mulcahy scored a vital goal to secure a 1-15 to 0-15 victory over Adare and a second championship medal for Hennessy.

On 19 October 2014, Hennessy won a third championship medal following a 1-15 to 0-14 defeat of reigning champions Na Piarsaigh. He later won a Munster Championship medal following a 1-32 to 3-18 extra-time defeat of Cratloe in the final. On 17 March 2015, Hennessy was in goal for Kilmallock in their 1-18 to 1-06 defeat by Ballyhale Shamrocks in the All-Ireland final at Croke Park.

Inter-county

Minor and under-21
Hennessy first played for the Limerick minor hurling team at the age of seventeen. He made his only appearance in that grade on 23 June 2007 in a 3-21 to 0-12 Munster Championship defeat by Tipperary. 

On 15 July 2009, Hennessy made his first appearance with the Limerick under-21 hurling team in a 4-22 to 2-13 defeat by Clare in the Munster Championship. His tenure with the under-21 team ended with a three-point defeat by Clare the following season.

Intermediate
Hennessy made his first appearance in goal for the Limerick intermediate hurling team in a 1-16 to 0-15 Munster Championship defeat of Clare on 22 June 2008. He later won a Munster Championship medal following a 2-16 to 2-12 victory over Tipperary in the final at Semple Stadium. On 30 August 2008, Hennessy was in goal when Limerick were defeated by six points by Kilkenny in the All-Ireland final.

Senior
Hennessy made his senior debut in goal for Limerick in a 0-19 to 2-09 defeat by University College Cork in the pre-season Waterford Crystal Cup on 23 January 2010. He made no further appearances that season as Tadhg Flynn became Limerick's first-choice goalkeeper. Hennessy was dropped from the panel the following season.

Hennessy returned to the Limerick senior panel under manager T. J. Ryan for the 2014 season. He was an unused substitute for the entire season. On 24 May 2015, Hennessy made his first Munster Championship appearance in a 1-19 to 2-15 defeat of Clare.

On 19 August 2018, Hennessy was a non-playing substitute when Limerick won their first All-Ireland title in 45 years after a 3-16 to 2-18 defeat of Galway in the final.

On 31 March 2019, Hennessy was named on the bench for Limerick's National League final meeting with Waterford at Croke Park. He collected a winners' medal as a non-playing substitute in the 1-24 to 0-19 victory. On 30 June 2019, Hennessy won a Munster Championship medal as a non-playing substitute following Limerick's 2-26 to 2-14 defeat of Tipperary in the final.

Personal life
Hennessy has spoken about his struggles with an eating disorder.

Career statistics

Honours
Kilmallock
Munster Senior Club Hurling Championship: 2014
Limerick Senior Hurling Championship: 2010, 2012, 2014, 2021
Limerick Under-21 Hurling Championships: 2007, 2008, 2009
Limerick Minor Hurling Championships: 2005, 2006

Limerick
All-Ireland Senior Hurling Championship: 2018, 2020, 2021, 2022
Munster Senior Hurling Championship: 2019, 2020, 2021, 2022
National Hurling League: 2019, 2020
Munster Intermediate Hurling Championship: 2008

References

1989 births
Living people
Hurling goalkeepers
Kilmallock hurlers
Limerick inter-county hurlers